Red Nose Day 2019 was a fundraising event organised by Comic Relief, broadcast live from BBC Elstree Centre on BBC One and BBC Two from the evening of 15 March 2019 to early the following morning. The event was broadcast from 7:00 pm to 2:30 am, and raised £63,548,668 for charity.

Main event

Presenters

Schedule
The telethon has traditionally taken the format of one broadcast with various presenting teams hosting typically for an hour at a time introducing a variety of sketches and appeal films. Since 2017, the broadcast has been split into different sections, with separate hosts, focusing on a specific theme or skit rather than featuring numerous sketches, appeal films and performances.

Appeal films
Ed Sheeran, Lenny Henry, Stacey Dooley, Shirley Ballas and Romesh Ranganathan fronted the appeal films for the 2019 telethon.

Sketches and features

Musical performances

References

Red Nose Day
2019 in British television
2019 in the United Kingdom
March 2019 events in the United Kingdom